Mysore–Mayiladuthurai Express is a overnight regional rail service connecting  in Tamil Nadu with  in Karnataka via , ,  and .

History
Initially, numbered as 3132, this service had 4 slip coaches linked with Island Express at Erode. Later, C. K. Jaffer Sharief,  the then Minister of Railways, introduced an exclusive full service between Bengaluru and Trichy as Train No.65316532 operated by Bengaluru railway division of Southern Railway zone, (before the formation of South Western Railway zone).

Extensions
Few coaches of the train were amalgamated and bifurcated at Karur for Madurai, numbered as 6531A6532A. After changing the train number from 65316532 to 62316232, it was first extended to Mysore, then to Thanjavur and to Nagore. On 29 June 2002, the train number was changed from 62316232 to 68316832 as the service was transferred from Mysore railway division  to Tiruchirappalli Railway Division with stoppage at Maddur was cancelled. The Tiruchi–Nagore service was trimmed for the execution of gauge conversion in the Tiruchi–Nagore section, sanctioned in 1995–1996 Railway Budget. As the Tiruchi–Thanjavur part was completed in 1998, the service again extended back to Thanjavur. After the completion of gauge conversion Thanjavur–Kumbakonam section in Chennai Egmore–Thanjavur line, Lalu Prasad Yadav, the then Railway Minister extended the service up to Kumbakonam, which was effected since 9 January 2006 along with change in train number from 68316832 to 62316232. The train number was changed from 62316232 to 1623116232 since December 2010 onwards as a part of train management system over the entire Indian Railways network.

Rakes
This train initially had 16 bogies, an extra sleeper coach was added in 1 July 2005. One more sleeper coach was added on 6 June 2013 and a couple of extra sleeper coaches were added on  8 June 2013. Presently it has 21 bogies composing of One AC 2–Tier (2A), Two AC 3–Tier (3A), Twelve II Sleeper coaches (SL), Four Unreserved (general) coaches (URGS) and Two Luggage rakes (SLR).

Schedule
This daily train numbered 16231 departs,   every evening as "Mysore Express",  reverses loco twice at Tiruchirappalli Junction and Erode Junction arrives  next morning. In the return journey, the train departs Mysore Junction as "Mayiladuthurai Express", numbered 16232 during late noon, follows the same route and reverses loco twice at Erode Junction and Tiruchirappalli Junction arrives Mayiladuthurai Junction next morning.

See also 
  Mysore - Thoothukudi Express
  Velankanni – Vasco da Gama Express

Notes

References

External links
 South Western Railway - Official website

Railway services introduced in 1989
Rail transport in Karnataka
Rail transport in Tamil Nadu
Named passenger trains of India